The 1900–01 season was the eighth season in which Dundee competed at a Scottish national level, playing in Division One and finishing in 7th place. Dundee would also compete in the Scottish Cup.

Scottish Division One 

Statistics provided by Dee Archive

League table

Scottish Cup 

Statistics provided by Dee Archive

Player Statistics 
Statistics provided by Dee Archive

|}

See also 

 List of Dundee F.C. seasons

References 

 

Dundee F.C. seasons
Dundee